Arthur James Wetherall Burgess (6 January 1879 – 16 April 1957) was a British painter. His work was part of the art competitions at the 1928 Summer Olympics and the 1932 Summer Olympics.

References

1879 births
1957 deaths
20th-century British painters
British male painters
Olympic competitors in art competitions
People from Bombala, New South Wales
19th-century British male artists
20th-century British male artists